The 1991 Guelph municipal election was held on November 12, 1991, in Guelph, Ontario, Canada, to elect the Mayor of Guelph, Guelph City Council and the Guelph members of the Upper Grand District School Board (Public) and Wellington Catholic District School Board. The election was one of many races across the province of Ontario.

It was also the first since 1930 to use wards to elect members of city council rather a citywide vote.  Two councillors were to be elected in each of the six new wards.

Results
Names in bold denotes elected candidates. 
(X) denotes incumbent.

Mayor

Mayoral race

Ward 1

Ward 1 Councillor, 2 To Be Elected

Ward 2

Ward 2 Councillor, 2 To Be Elected

Ward 3

Ward 3 Councillor, 2 To Be Elected

Ward 4

Ward 4 Councillor, 2 To Be Elected

Ward 5

Ward 5 Councillor, 2 To Be Elected

Ward 6

Ward 6 Councillor, 2 To Be Elected

References
The Guelph Tribune, November 13, 1991

1991 Ontario municipal elections
1991
November 1991 events in Canada